The 1916 United States presidential election in Kentucky took place on November 7, 1916 as part of the 1916 United States presidential election. Voters chose thirteen representatives, or electors to the Electoral College, who voted for president and vice president.

Background and vote 
Ever since the Civil War, Kentucky had been shaped politically by divisions created by that war between secessionist, Democratic counties and Unionist, Republican ones, although the state as a whole leaned Democratic throughout this era and the GOP had carried the state only once – by a very narrow margin in 1896 when northern parts of the state were affected by hostility towards William Jennings Bryan, and state native John M. Palmer drew votes from the Democrats.

Unlike the former Confederate states, Kentucky was not able to disfranchise its relatively small black population in the 1900s, and this helped the Republicans carry the governorship in 1907 and narrowly fail to do so in 1915. Reunited after the 1912 debacle between Taft and Roosevelt, the GOP under Charles Evans Hughes visited the state in September and thought it could win a substantial plurality. Wilson also visited Kentucky in September, thought for a large part of the fall the Republicans continued to believe they possessed a chance of carrying Kentucky’s thirteen electoral votes, after another campaign tour with Theodore Roosevelt. However, by the second week of October polls were suggesting that Wilson would comfortably carry the Bluegrass State, and by the end of the months Wilson had five-eighths of the vote over Hughes, which would have been the best Democratic performance in the state between 1872 and 1960 if maintained.

Ultimately Wilson carried the state by 5.41 percent, an improvement of around three points on the narrow victories of Alton B. Parker and William Jennings Bryan in Kentucky’s previous three two-party contests, although much less than the last polls.

Results

Results by county

Notes

Reference 

Kentucky
1916
1916 Kentucky elections